A Test of Violence is a 1969 BAFTA nominated British short film directed by Stuart Cooper.

Summary
Stuart Cooper's short, about the work of Spanish artist Juan Genovés, is an inspired introduction to the works of this extraordinary artist, exploring its minimalist aesthetic and storytelling qualities through a variety of cinematic techniques, including rostrum, animation, news footage and live action recreations.

Accolades
The film went on to win awards at multiple film festivals.

External links

View the short on the Camera Effects website (rostrum and opticals showreel)
A Test of Violence on YouTube

References

British short documentary films
Films directed by Stuart Cooper
1969 films
1960s short documentary films
Documentary films about painters
1960s English-language films
1960s British films